The playoff round of the 2021 IIHF World Championship was held from 3 to 6 June 2021. The top four of each preliminary group qualified for the playoff round.

Qualified teams

Qualified teams' seedings
Quarter-finalists were paired according to their positions in the groups: the first-place team in each preliminary-round group played the fourth-place team of the other group, while the second-place team played the third-place team of the other group.

Semi-finalists are paired according to their seeding after the preliminary round, which is determined by the following criteria: 1)position in the group; 2)number of points; 3)goal difference; 4)number of goals scored for; 5)seeding number entering the tournament. The best-ranked semi-finalist plays against the lowest-ranked semi-finalist, while the second-best ranked semi-finalist plays the third-best ranked semi-finalist.

Bracket
There will be a re-seeding after the quarterfinals.

All times are local (UTC+3).

Quarterfinals

Switzerland vs Germany

United States vs Slovakia

ROC vs Canada

Finland vs Czech Republic

Semifinals

United States vs Canada

Finland vs Germany

Bronze medal game

Gold medal game

References

External links
Official website

P